In human anatomy, the lateral thoracic artery (or external mammary artery) is a blood vessel that supplies oxygenated blood to the lateral structures of the thorax and breast.

It originates from the axillary artery and follows the lower border of the Pectoralis minor muscle to the side of the chest, supplies the Serratus anterior muscle and the Pectoralis major muscle, and sends branches across the axilla to the axillary lymph nodes and Subscapularis muscle.

It anastomoses with the internal thoracic artery, subscapular, and intercostal arteries, and with the pectoral branch of the thoracoacromial artery.

In the female it supplies an external mammary branch which turns round the free edge of the Pectoralis major and supplies the breasts.

References

External links
 

Arteries of the upper limb